Minnesota United FC is an American professional soccer club based in Saint Paul, Minnesota that plays in the Western Conference of Major League Soccer. The club began play in 2017 as the league's 22nd club, and replaced the North American Soccer League (NASL) franchise of the same name.

The club played its home games at TCF Bank Stadium, on the campus of the University of Minnesota in Minneapolis, for its first two seasons in MLS play. The club began playing in Saint Paul (becoming the city's fourth professional sports team, joining the Minnesota Wild, the St. Paul Saints, and Minnesota Whitecaps), at Allianz Field in the Midway neighborhood starting in the spring of 2019.

Minnesota United FC's ownership is led by Bill McGuire, former CEO of UnitedHealth Group, and includes other Minnesota sports owners: the Pohlad family, owners of the Twins; former Timberwolves owner Glen Taylor; former Wild investor Glen Nelson, and his daughter Wendy Carlson Nelson of the Carlson hospitality company.

History 
On March 25, 2015, Major League Soccer commissioner Don Garber announced Minnesota United as the league's 23rd club and awarded the franchise to a group led by McGuire. The ownership group includes other Minneapolis-St. Paul sports owners, Twins owner Jim Pohlad, Timberwolves owner Glen Taylor, and Wild investor Glen Nelson.  They beat out a competing bid by Minnesota Vikings owners Mark and Zygi Wilf (both of whom would later become minority owners of MLS expansion franchise Nashville SC). Garber said Minnesota would begin play in 2017 or 2018 – if Los Angeles FC was not ready to play in 2017, Minnesota would take its place.

The Twin Cities were previously represented by the Minnesota Kicks in the top-level North American Soccer League (NASL) from 1976 to 1981, and later the Minnesota Strikers in 1984. The Kicks played their home games at Bloomington's Metropolitan Stadium, while the Strikers played at the Hubert H. Humphrey Metrodome.

The Minnesota Legislature had passed a bill in May 2012 for a new NFL stadium projected to open by fall 2016 and gave a provision allowing for the Vikings to pursue an MLS franchise, including a five-year exclusive window to host MLS games in the new stadium. The Wilfs' bid also had the support of Minneapolis Mayor Betsy Hodges, and Minnesota Senator Tom Bakk called Major League Soccer to inform them that the state legislature would not be providing financing for a soccer-specific stadium. However, Commissioner Garber said that whenever possible, the league preferred a stadium that would be an "outdoor, soccer-specific stadium, 20,000 seats, playing on grass" as opposed to larger, covered venues with artificial turf like U.S. Bank Stadium, and McGuire had the support of Hennepin County Commissioner Mike Opat and at least three members of the Minneapolis City Council.

2017 season 
The team played their inaugural Major League Soccer match on March 3, 2017, a 5–1 away defeat to the Portland Timbers at Providence Park. The result represented the heaviest defeat by an expansion side making their debut. Previously no MLS expansion team had lost by more than two goals in their first game. Christian Ramirez scored the team's first MLS goal. They lost the game 6–1, handing Minnesota more unwanted records including the record defeat of any expansion side and becoming the only team in MLS history to concede five or more in consecutive games. Following a 2–2 draw at the Colorado Rapids and a 5–2 loss at New England Revolution, United had conceded 18 goals in their first four games, which is an MLS record through the first six games of a season. The team got its first win in MLS with a 4–2 home victory over Real Salt Lake on April 1. As the season progressed, so had the team. In the mid-season, Minnesota had acquired Duluth native Ethan Finlay from Columbus Crew SC and made other signings to improve on the field. United finished its inaugural MLS season in ninth place in the Western Conference.

2018 season 
MNUFC lost two key players - midfielders Kevin Molino and Ethan Finlay - to season-ending knee injuries early in the 2018 season.  Shortly before Finlay's injury, the team signed its first Designated Player; Darwin Quintero joined Minnesota United from Liga MX's Club América. Despite joining the team after five matches had already been played, Quintero led the team for 2018 in both goals (11) and assists (15).  On July 4, 2018, Quintero scored a hat trick in a home match versus Toronto FC, the first in Minnesota United's history.  Colombian forward Ángelo Rodríguez joined the club as its second Designated Player later in the season.  MNUFC averaged nearly 24,000 fans per match during its second year at TCF Bank Stadium, including a crowd of 52,242 at the final match in their temporary home.  The team managed 10 wins at home, but struggled on the road with only one victory.

2019 season 

MNUFC made substantial roster additions prior to the 2019 season, including its third Designated Player, midfielder Ján Greguš from F.C. Copenhagen; 2017 MLS Defender of the Year Ike Opara, traded from Sporting KC; longtime Seattle Sounders defensive midfielder Osvaldo Alonso; Ligue 2 defender Romain Métanire; and goalkeeper Vito Mannone, loaned from Reading F.C.

After beginning the 2019 season with five matches on the road, MNUFC played their first match at the new Allianz Field on April 13, earning a 3–3 draw versus New York City FC.  The team went on to post 10 wins, 6 draws and 2 losses at home.  MNUFC's performance on the road was vastly improved in 2019, posting 5 wins and 2 draws including a 2-0 statement win at LAFC on September 1.

The club made a very successful run in the 2019 U.S. Open Cup. On August 27, the club traveled to Mercedes Benz Stadium to take on Atlanta United in the Cup final, Minnesota's first final appearance since joining MLS. The match resulted in a 2–1 Atlanta victory.

MNUFC finished fourth in the Western Conference, after placing as high as second late in the regular season.  As a result, the club was awarded a spot in the 2020 Leagues Cup. MNUFC played in its first MLS playoff match, hosting the LA Galaxy on October 20; the result was a 2–1 defeat.

Two players received league-wide honors at the conclusion of the season. Ike Opara was named 2019 MLS Defender of the Year, winning the award for the second time. Vito Mannone, who earned 11 cleansheets and conceded only 43 goals, was named 2019 MLS Goalkeeper of the Year.

2020 season 

After the 2019 season, Minnesota United traded Darwin Quintero to the Houston Dynamo for midfielder Marlon Hairston and $600,000 in allocation money. Upon the end of goalkeeper Vito Mannone's loan, Minnesota United brought in Tyler Miller (soccer) via trade with Los Angeles FC to take the starting job.  Prior to the season, MNUFC added a number of players including striker Luis Amarilla via loan from Club Atlético Vélez Sarsfield.

The Loons got off to an excellent start for 2020 with two convincing road wins at the Portland Timbers and San Jose Earthquakes in March, before Major League Soccer suspended its season due to the COVID-19 epidemic, first for 30 days and then indefinitely as the severity of the epidemic became clearer.

The 2020 season restarted in July with the league's MLS is Back Tournament, held in Orlando, Florida and including 24 of the league's 26 teams.  The month-long tournament included a group stage, counted as part of the regular season standings; and a knockout stage. The Loons finished second in Group D, with one win and two draws.  In the knockout stage, MNUFC defeated the Columbus Crew 1–1 on penalty kicks and the San Jose Earthquakes 4–1, before losing to Orlando City SC in the tournament semifinal.

Following the tournament, the 2020 season resumed normal match play, with a planned schedule of 18 matches ending on November 8.  The Loons continued to add players, with midfielder Emanuel Reynoso joining the club from Boca Juniors as a Designated Player, and veteran forward Kei Kamara joining via trade from the Colorado Rapids.

MNUFC finished the regular season in fourth place in the MLS Western Conference. They hosted their second playoff match in franchise history, defeating the Colorado Rapids 3–0 at Allianz Field, then went on to defeat No. 1 seeded Sporting Kansas City 3–0 on the road. The Loons then traveled to Seattle for the Western Conference final match against the Sounders. Despite leading 2-0 at the 75th minute, Seattle scored three straight late goals, including the winner in stoppage time to end Minnesota's historic run.

2021 season 
Although they had been minutes from advancing to the MLS Cup final in 2020, the 2021 season got off to a disappointing start, with four straight losses. In mid May, the Loons began to quickly climb from the bottom of the table, losing only two of their next seventeen games.  Key players returned from injury and the squad signed Argentinian Franco Fragapane and Frenchman Adrien Hunou. They ended the regular season in fifth place, earning an opening round playoff berth on the road against the Portland Timbers, but their season was ended with a 3-1 Portland victory.

2022 season 
2022 saw the breakout of goalkeeper Dayne St. Clair who anchored an impressive 8-save shutout against the New York Red Bulls in his week 3 debut. Success started early for the Loons in July in 2022, with a 4-0 win in a friendly vs Premier League side Everton. The Loons had a solid first half of the season going 8-6-3 in the first 17 games. In the 2022 U.S. Open Cup Minnesota fell to USL League One side Union Omaha 2-1 in a notable upset. Midfield DP Emanuel Reynoso joined St. Clair in the 2022 MLS All-Star Game which was hosted at Allianz Field.

The second half of the season saw Minnesota struggle to find their footing with a 6-game winless streak going into the final 2 games of the season. Minnesota finally won a make-or-break game against the Vancouver Whitecaps decision day to clinch the 6th seed in the 2022 MLS Cup Playoffs, making them the only team in the western conference to qualify for the playoffs 4 years in a row. After finishing 120 minutes tied 1-1, MNUFC was knocked out of the playoffs in a (5)-(4) shootout against FC Dallas.

Colors and badge

The badge features a stylized loon, which is the state bird of Minnesota, with eleven spread feathers, one for each of the players on the field. The team's colors are gray, sky blue, and black, with a red accent. The blue line across the logo represents the Mississippi River. The two sides of the blue represent the cities of Saint Paul and Minneapolis. The gray color represents the Iron Range of Minnesota. The upward pointing crest and the North Star were inspired by L'Etoile du Nord which is the state motto. Zeus Jones created the designs.

Kit suppliers and shirt sponsors

Club culture 

Minnesota United's mascot is PK, a loon. PK has been the club mascot since mid-2014. The two main supporter groups of Minnesota United FC are Dark Clouds and True North Elite, although the overarching organization "MNWonderwall" includes affiliated groups the Red Loons and Dark Glitterati as well. Along with these supporters the Loons academy has been a big part to help grow youth in the community and to provide a path to the first team for the academy players.  In early 2019, Wonderwall founded "THUNDERWALL", a coalition drumline permanently affixed in Allianz Field that provides percussion to support chants in the Wonderwall section during match days.

Fans of Minnesota United sing the Oasis song "Wonderwall" after all home victories.

Stadium

McGuire stated a desire to build an 18,500-seat, outdoor soccer-specific stadium next to the Minneapolis Farmers Market in downtown Minneapolis. At the time of the club's launch, the league did not give any timeline for the stadium plan, but said it was working on finalizing a plan by July 1, 2015, the deadline set by the league. Minnesota Governor Mark Dayton said he would oppose a publicly financed stadium, but said he would not oppose ancillary support for infrastructure reinforcements.

In a plan released in April 2015, the ownership showed a projected cost for the stadium of $250 million: $100 million for MLS expansion fee, $30 million for land acquisition, and $120 million for construction. The ownership group met with Governor Dayton and other state political leaders to share the plan. The group asked the politicians for a sales tax exemption of up to $3 million on construction materials, as well as breaks or caps on city and county property taxes for the stadium site. The tax relief could potentially add up to around $50 million.

The day after the meeting, Mayor Hodges said she opposed the sales tax and property tax exemption because unlike other stadiums in Minneapolis that have received similar breaks, Minnesota United's stadium would be privately owned. The following week, the Minnesota Senate voted 61–4 to prevent any state funds or tax expenditures from being used for the stadium, although the vote was termed "largely symbolic" as McGuire had not asked for state funds and the bill would not prevent the team from seeking city or county funds. McGuire later said that he would be open to signing the property over to Minneapolis, Hennepin County, or another public entity if that would make property tax exemption possible.

Although the July 1 deadline passed without a stadium deal, and the plan for a Downtown Minneapolis stadium was the primary reason for choosing McGuire's group, league deputy commissioner Mark Abbott said Minnesota was still considered an expansion site, partly because of interest from the neighboring St. Paul. Later that month, St. Paul mayor Chris Coleman spoke to Abbott proposed building on a city-owned vacant lot that formerly housed the Metro Transit bus barn near Interstate 94.

On August 31, 2015, the team's deal for an exclusive right to purchase industrial land near the Farmer's Market expired with no public statement about any extension of the deal.

On September 8, 2015, the Ramsey County Board of Commissioners passed a non-binding resolution to support the stadium's construction on the St. Paul bus barn site, provided the design and construction are paid for by private funds.
On October 23, 2015, it was announced that Minnesota United would build a stadium on the 35-acre St. Paul Bus Barn site. The proposed stadium will seat approximately 20,000 and will be privately financed.

On November 25, 2015, Minnesota United FC hired Populous to design the stadium.
On December 9, 2015, the team hired Mortenson Construction as part of the stadium construction along with Populous.

On February 24, 2016, the team revealed design plans for their 21,500-seat soccer-specific stadium, set to be built by 2018 and financed privately by the team.

On July 25, 2017, the stadium's name was announced as Allianz Field, which opened in March 2019.

On August 19, 2016, it was announced that Minnesota United would play in the 2017 Major League Soccer season, with home matches at TCF Bank Stadium.
The stadium had been home to the club for 2017–2018 while their soccer-specific stadium was in construction.

Players and staff

Roster

Management

Coaching staff
 Adrian Heath – head coach
 Ian Fuller – assistant coach
 Sean McAuley – assistant coach
 Stewart Kerr – goalkeeping coach

Technical staff
 Manny Lagos – chief soccer officer
 Mark Watson – technical director
 Stacey Hardin – senior director of player health and performance
 Amos Magee – director of player personnel

Front office
 Dr. Bill McGuire – managing director
 Shari Ballard – chief executive officer
 Bryant Pfieffer – executive vice president, chief revenue officer
 Maureen Smith – executive vice president, chief operating officer
 Sara Daggett – executive vice president, general counsel
 John Guagliano – senior vice president, marketing and communications
 Maureen Smith – senior vice president, corporate partnership sales and activation
 Justin Borrell – general manager, Allianz Field

Team records

List of seasons

For the full season-by-season history, see List of Minnesota United FC seasons.

1. Avg. attendance include statistics from league matches only.
2. Top goalscorer(s) includes all goals scored in League, Playoffs, U.S. Open Cup, MLS is Back Tournament, CONCACAF Champions League, FIFA Club World Cup, and other competitive continental matches.

Record vs. international opponents

Honors
U.S. Open Cup
Runners-up (1): 2019

Broadcasting
From 2023, every Minnesota United match is available via MLS Season Pass on the Apple TV app. Prior to streaming, Minnesota United aired on a number of stations and networks catering to the Twin Cities television market.

All non-nationally broadcast Minnesota United games were broadcast locally on WFTC for the 2017 Major League Soccer season, then moved to Bally Sports North and Bally Sports Wisconsin in the 2018 season (which were then named at the time as Fox Sports North and Fox Sports Wisconsin respectively). For the 2021 Major League Soccer season, WUCW became the over-the-air home of Minnesota United, airing 16 matches as simulcasts from Bally Sports North. KSTP serves as the team's radio partner.

Minnesota United's commentary team featured Callum Williams as the play-by-play commentator. Williams had previously worked for Sporting Kansas City when they were known as the Kansas City Wizards and during their rebrand as Sporting Kansas City. He has also worked in his native UK for notable broadcasters including the BBC and Sky Sports. Williams was joined in the commentary box by Kyndra de St. Aubin who provides color commentary. De St. Aubin, a Stillwater native, was the only female color commentator currently covering Major League Soccer. Prior to joining Minnesota United's broadcast team, she worked across the country covering many men's and women's soccer games at college and professional levels. She also covered the 2015 FIFA Women's World Cup as part of the five broadcast teams that covered that tournament.

References

External links 
 

 
Sports in Blaine, Minnesota
Soccer clubs in Minneapolis–Saint Paul
Association football clubs established in 2015
2015 establishments in Minnesota
Major League Soccer teams
Sports in Saint Paul, Minnesota